The Clark House is a historic house at 1324 South Main Street in Malvern, Arkansas.  It is a -story wood-frame structure, roughly rectangular in plan, with a side-gable roof, projecting front-facing cross-gable sections on the left side, and a hip-roofed porch extending to the right.  The roof extends over a recessed porch, with exposed rafter ends and brick pier supports.  It was built in 1916 in Bungalow/Craftsman style to a design by architect Charles L. Thompson.

The house was listed on the National Register of Historic Places in 1982.

See also
National Register of Historic Places listings in Hot Spring County, Arkansas

References

Houses on the National Register of Historic Places in Arkansas
Houses completed in 1916
Houses in Hot Spring County, Arkansas
American Craftsman architecture in Arkansas
Bungalow architecture in Arkansas
National Register of Historic Places in Hot Spring County, Arkansas
Buildings and structures in Malvern, Arkansas
1916 establishments in Arkansas